Elkhorn Mountains may refer to:

Elkhorn Mountains in Montana
Elkhorn Mountains (Oregon), a subrange of the Blue Mountains